Tu Nahin Aur Sahi is a 1960 Hindi-language film directed by Brij. It stars Pradeep Kumar, Kumkum in lead roles with music by Ravi.

Cast
 Pradeep Kumar as Ratan
 Kumkum as Geeta
 Nishi as Bimla
 Minoo Mumtaz as Rita
 Helen
 Murad
 Kundan
 Tun Tun

Music
Music of the film was composed by Ravi and the songs were written by Majrooh Sultanpuri, Asad Bhopali and Shakeel Numani.

References

External links

1960s Hindi-language films
1960 films
Films scored by Ravi
Films directed by Brij Sadanah